ParaNorman is a 2012 American stop-motion animated comedy horror film directed by Sam Fell and Chris Butler (the latter's feature directorial debut), and written by Butler. Produced by Laika, the film stars the voices of Kodi Smit-McPhee, Jodelle Ferland, Bernard Hill, Tucker Albrizzi, Anna Kendrick, Casey Affleck, Christopher Mintz-Plasse, Leslie Mann, Jeff Garlin, Elaine Stritch,  Tempestt Bledsoe, Alex Borstein, and John Goodman. It is the first stop-motion film to use a 3D color printer to create character faces, and only the second to be shot in 3D. In the film, Norman Babcock, a young boy who can communicate with ghosts, is given the task of ending a 300-year-old witch's curse on his Massachusetts town.

The idea of ParaNorman came from Buter, who thought making such a movie for kids could help express the challenges kids face growing up, after realizing that zombie films often contained a degree of social commentary. Production of the stop-motion animation feature took place at Laika's studio in Hillsboro, Oregon for three years, with the animating stage of production lasting about two years and beginning in late 2009. Instead of using traditional 3D format cameras, the studio had sixty Canon EOS 5D Mark II DSLR cameras film the movie. Jon Brion composed the film's musical score.

ParaNorman was officially released on August 17, 2012, by Focus Features. It received generally positive reviews from critics, who praised its animation and humor, and was a modest box office success, earning $107 million worldwide against its budget of $60 million. The film was nominated for that year's Academy Award for Best Animated Feature and BAFTA Award for Best Animated Film, but lost both to Pixar's Brave.

Plot
In the small fictional town of Blithe Hollow, Massachusetts, Norman Babcock is an 11-year-old boy who speaks with the dead, including his late grandmother and various ghosts in town. Almost no one believes him and he is isolated emotionally from his family while being looked down upon by his own peers around the school. Neil Downe, an overweight boy who is also bullied, finds in Norman a kindred spirit. After rehearsing a school play commemorating the town's execution of a witch three centuries ago, the boys are confronted by Norman's estranged and seemingly deranged great-uncle, Mr. Prenderghast, who tells Norman that he soon must take up his regular ritual to protect the town. Soon after this encounter, Mr. Prenderghast dies of a heart attack.

During the official performance of the school play, Norman has a nightmarish vision of the town's past in which he is pursued through the woods by townsfolk on a witch hunt, embarrassing himself and leading to a heated argument with his estranged and paranoid father Perry, who later grounds him. His mother Sandra tells him that his father's manner is stern  because he is afraid for him. The next day, Norman sees Prenderghast's spirit who tells him that the ritual must be performed with a certain book before sundown that day; then making him "swear" to complete the task, Prenderghast's spirit is set free and crosses over. Norman is at first reluctant to go because he is scared but his grandmother tells him it is all right to be scared as long as he does not let it change who he is. Norman sets off to retrieve the book from Prenderghast's house (having to take it from his corpse).

He then goes to the graves of the five men and two women who were cursed by the witch, but finds that the book is merely a series of fairy tales. Alvin, a school bully who always picks on Norman, arrives and prevents Norman from reading the story before sundown. Norman attempts to continue reading from the book, to no effect. A ghostly storm resembling the witch appears in the air, summoning the cursed dead to arise as zombies, who chase the boys along with Neil, Norman's 17-year-old sister Courtney, and Neil's older brother Mitch, down the hill and into town. Having realized that the witch was not buried in the graveyard, Norman contacts classmate Salma (who tells them to access the Town Hall's archives for the location of the witch's unmarked grave) for help. As the kids make their way to the Town Hall, the zombies are attacked by the citizenry. During the riot, Norman and his companions break into the archives but cannot find the information they need. As the mob moves to attack Town Hall, the witch storm appears over the crowd. Norman climbs the Hall's tower to read the book, in a last-ditch effort to finish the ritual, but the witch strikes the book with lightning, hurling Norman from the tower and deep into the archives.

Unconscious, Norman has a dream where he learns that the witch was Agatha "Aggie" Prenderghast, a little girl of his age and a distant relative, who was also a medium. Norman realizes that Aggie was wrongfully convicted by the town council when they mistook her powers for witchcraft. After awakening, Norman encounters the zombies and recognizes them as the town council who convicted Aggie. The zombies and their leader Judge Hopkins admit that they only wanted to speak with him to ensure that he would take up the ritual, to minimize the damage of the mistake they made so long ago. Norman attempts to help the zombies slip away so they can guide him to Aggie's grave, but is cornered by the mob. Courtney, Mitch, Neil, and Alvin rally to Norman's side and confront the crowd, arguing that their rage, fear, and misunderstanding make them no different from the cursed townsfolk from long ago. Although the mob realizes the error of their ways, the witch unleashes her powers to create greater havoc throughout the town.

Judge Hopkins guides Norman's family to the grave in a forest. Before the grave is reached, Aggie's magical powers separate Norman from the others. Norman finds the grave and interacts with Aggie's vengeful spirit, determined to stop the cataclysmic tantrum she has been having over the years. Though she attempts to push him away, Norman holds his ground, telling her that he understands how she feels as an outcast, that her vengeance has only made her like the ones who wronged her, causing her to remember happier days. Having finally encountered someone who understands her plight and by remembering her caring mother, Aggie is able to find a measure of peace and cross over to the afterlife. The storm dissipates, and she, the zombies and even the Judge all fade away. The town cleans up and regards Norman as a hero.

In the end, Norman watches a horror film with his family and the ghost of his grandmother, who have grown to accept Norman for who he is.

Voice cast
 Kodi Smit-McPhee as Norman Babcock, an 11-year-old misfit who can speak to the dead
 Jodelle Ferland as Agatha "Aggie" Prenderghast, the ghost of an 11-year-old girl from the 1700s who was accused of witchcraft
 Bernard Hill as Judge Hopkins, the deceased judge who accused and punished Aggie for witchcraft, and the leader of the cursed zombies
 Tucker Albrizzi as Neil Downe, Norman's 10-year-old overweight best friend
 Anna Kendrick as Courtney Babcock, Norman's 17-year-old sister and a cheerleader
 Christopher Mintz-Plasse as Alvin, a 15-year-old school bully
 Casey Affleck as Mitch Downe, Neil's 20-year-old brother and a jock who is the target of Courtney's affections. He later reveals that he has a boyfriend, making him the first openly gay character in an animated film.
 John Goodman as Mr. Prenderghast, Sandra's uncle, Courtney and Norman's great uncle and the town's local eccentric
 Elaine Stritch as Grandma Babcock, the ghost of Courtney and Norman's deceased grandmother
 Jeff Garlin as Perry Babcock, Courtney and Norman's stern father who is concerned about his son's well-being
 Leslie Mann as Sandra Babcock (née Prenderghast), Courtney and Norman's sympathetic mother
 Tempestt Bledsoe as Sheriff Hooper, the sheriff of Blithe Hollow
 Alex Borstein as Mrs. Henscher, Norman and Neil's drama teacher
 Austin Dickey as Bully
 Hannah Noyes as Salma, a smart girl from Norman's class
 Ariel Winter as Blithe Hollow Kid
 Jared Dines as Bully
 Bridget Hoffman as Crystal and Parachutist Ghost
 Scott Menville as Deputy Wayne, a deputy who works for Sheriff Hooper
 David Cowgill as Greaser Ghost
 Wendy Hoffman as Gucci Lady
 Jeremy Shada as Pug
 Emily Hahn as Sweet Girl
 Jack Blessing as Civil War Ghost

Blithe Hollow townspeople are voiced by Kirk Baily, Cam Clarke, Lara Cody, Eddie Frierson, Rif Hutton, Edie Mirman and David Zyler.

Production

The idea of the film came from Chris Butler, who, realizing that zombie films often contained a degree of social commentary, thought making such a movie for kids could help express the challenges kids face growing up.

Production of the stop-motion animation feature took place at Laika's studio in Hillsboro, Oregon. The film was in production for three years, with the animating stage of production lasting about two years and beginning in late 2009. Rather than using traditional 3D format cameras, the studio had sixty Canon EOS 5D Mark II DSLR cameras film the movie. Advertising agency Wieden+Kennedy created the campaign for the film. ParaNorman is the first ever stop motion film to use full-color 3D printers for replacement animation. Laika's previous film Coraline had pioneered and popularized the use of black and white 3D printers, which sped up puppet production considerably and allowed the team to make the large number of puppet faces required for the film. "Quite often it’s the stop-motion movies that are more out there," co-director Fell told The New York Times. "They're a little quirkier, they're a little harder to pin down."

Soundtrack
Jon Brion composed the film's score, and an accompanying soundtrack album was released on August 14, 2012. Bits of other music appear in the film, including the theme music from Halloween, the Donovan song "Season of the Witch" (sung by the school play cast) and "Fix Up, Look Sharp" by British rapper Dizzee Rascal. "Little Ghost", a White Stripes song from their 2005 album Get Behind Me Satan, plays at the end, over character cards identifying the main cast. However, one track in the film, an updated version of "Aggie Fights", was not included in the soundtrack.

Release

Home media
ParaNorman was released on DVD and Blu-ray on November 27, 2012 by Universal Pictures Home Entertainment. A new edition from Shout! Factory under license from Universal was released on September 14, 2021.

Other media
A game called ParaNorman: 2-Bit Bub was made for iPhone.

Reception

Critical response
Review aggregator website Rotten Tomatoes gives ParaNorman an approval rating of 89% based on 190 reviews, and an average score of 7.3/10. The website's critical consensus reads, "Beautifully animated and solidly scripted, ParaNorman will entertain (and frighten) older children while providing surprisingly thoughtful fare for their parents." Metacritic gives the film a weighted average score of 72 out of 100 based on 33 reviews, which indicates "generally favorable reviews." Audiences surveyed by CinemaScore gave the film an average grade of "B+" on an A+ to F scale.

Justin Chang of Variety wrote in his review, "Few movies so taken with death have felt so rudely alive as ParaNorman, the latest handcrafted marvel from the stop-motion artists at Laika." Michael Rechtshaffen of The Hollywood Reporter said, "It has its entertaining moments, but this paranormal stop-motion animated comedy-chiller cries out for more activity."

Box office
ParaNorman earned $56 million in North America, and $51.1 million in other territories, for a worldwide total of $107.1 million. The film premiered in Mexico on August 3, 2012, opening in second place with box office receipts of $2.2 million, behind The Dark Knight Rises. For its opening weekend in North America, the film placed third, with receipts of $14 million, behind The Expendables 2 and The Bourne Legacy. Travis Knight, head of the studio that produced the film, believed the box office total was fine, but did not live up to his expectations.

Gay character
The film has drawn attention for the revelation in its final scenes that supporting character Mitch is gay, making him the first openly gay character in a mainstream animated film. Nancy French of National Review Online suggested that the film could lead parents "to answer unwanted questions about sex and homosexuality on the way home from the movie theater." Conversely, Mike Ryan of The Huffington Post cited Mitch's inclusion as one of the reasons why ParaNorman is "remarkable." Co-director Chris Butler said that the character was explicitly connected with the film's message: "If we're saying to anyone that watches this movie don't judge other people, then we've got to have the strength of our convictions." In 2013, ParaNorman was the first-ever PG-rated movie nominated by GLAAD in its annual GLAAD Media Awards, but lost to The Perks of Being a Wallflower.

Accolades

See also
 List of ghost films

References

External links

 
 
 
 
 
 
 
 ParaNorman DVD & Blu-ray  at Universal Studios Home Entertainment
 Official novel website 

2010s American animated films
2010s comedy horror films
2010s ghost films
2012 LGBT-related films
2012 3D films
2012 animated films
2012 films
2010s children's films
2012 horror films
American 3D films
American animated horror films
American ghost films
American LGBT-related films
American zombie comedy films
Animated films about children
Clay animation films
Children's horror films
Films about psychic powers
Films about witchcraft
Films directed by Sam Fell
Films scored by Jon Brion
Films set in Massachusetts
Films set in the 1710s
Films shot in Oregon
Focus Features animated films
Focus Features films
Laika (company) animated films
LGBT-related animated films
LGBT-related comedy films
LGBT-related horror films
Gay-related films
Middle school films
2010s stop-motion animated films
3D animated films
Animated films about revenge
American supernatural horror films
2012 comedy films
2012 directorial debut films
American animated feature films
2010s English-language films